Ostankovo is a rural locality (a village) in Vysokovskoye Rural Settlement, Ust-Kubinsky  District, Vologda Oblast, Russia. The population was 9 as of 2002.

Geography 
Ostankovo is located 7 km northeast of Ustye (the district's administrative centre) by road. Belavino is the nearest rural locality.

References 

Rural localities in Tarnogsky District